Munkfors is a bimunicipal locality and the seat of Munkfors Municipality in Värmland County, Sweden with 3,054 inhabitants in 2010. It is also partly located in Hagfors Municipality.

References 

Municipal seats of Värmland County
Swedish municipal seats
Populated places in Värmland County
Populated places in Hagfors Municipality
Populated places in Munkfors Municipality